The Boy Who Stole a Million is a 1960 British comedy thriller film directed by Charles Crichton who called it "pretty simple." 

The film was shot on location in the Spanish city of Valencia, with an international cast list. With multiple street locations it acts as an excellent showcase for the city and a good historical record of the city in the late 1950s (when filmed).

Plot
When he learns that his father needs to find 10,000 pesetas (approximately £60) to finance repairs to his taxi, or face losing his business and livelihood, naïve young Paco decides to "borrow" a million pesetas from the bank where he has a small part-time job after school.

He is forced to hide around the city when he starts to be pursued not only by the police, but also seemingly by all the criminal low-life of the city, all eager to get their hands on the cash.  Paco finds himself on the run all through Valencia, from the most elegant quarters with their wide streets and squares in the midst of fiesta time, to the city's most squalid and dangerous slums.

Paco has no concept of money in the adult sense. When he is hungry he tells a street vendor that he "has no money" and has to beg for the food.

Hiding beside a blind beggar the man leads him to an abandoned basement and attacks him, as he too has heard of the child and missing money.

The package of money gets thrown in a garbage truck and Paco ends up scraping through piles of rubbish with local street urchins who do this to survive. He finds it and spends some time with the group. Meanwhile his father drives around the city with two friends, also searching for him.

When his father eventually finds him Paco explains that he heard his father say he would disown him if he ever stole. After one final fight with the pursuing thugs they take the cash back to the bank. The bank manager is very understanding and merely charges Paco 168 pesetas interest for the 24 hours he had the money. They agree the bank will take this interest charge out of Paco's wages at the rate of 2 pesetas per week.

Cast
 Maurice Reyna as Paco
 Virgilio Teixeira as Miguel
 Marianne Benet as Maria
 Harold Kasket as Luis
 George Coulouris as Bank Manager
 Warren Mitchell as Pedro
 Tutte Lemkow as Mateo
 Edwin Richfield as Commissionnaire
 Bill Nagy as Police Chief
 Barta Barri as Gang Leader
 Paul Whitsun-Jones as Desk Sergeant
 Robert Rietti as Detective
 Cyril Shaps as Bank Clerk
 Xan Das Bolas as Knife Grinder

Production
The film was originally budgeted at £100,000 - £49,500 coming from Lloyds Bank/Barclays, £49,500 coming from Paramount and £1,000 deferred from Paramount. The film went over budget and the rest was made up by the guarantor, Film Finances.

Reception

Box Office
The film recorded a loss to Bryanston of £52,330.

References

External links 
 
 The Boy Who Stole a Million at BFI Film & TV Database

1960 films
1960 comedy films
British comedy films
Films directed by Charles Crichton
British chase films
British black-and-white films
1960s chase films
Films shot in Valencia
Films set in Spain
1960s English-language films
1960s British films